The UNTC-CS ("National Union of Workers of Cape Verde - Central Union") is a national trade union centre in Cape Verde with 21 affiliated unions.

References

Trade unions in Cape Verde
International Trade Union Confederation
Trade unions established in 1978
1978 establishments in Cape Verde
Organizations based in Praia